The Le Trou Aid Post Cemetery is a World War I cemetery located in the commune of Fleurbaix, in the Pas-de-Calais departement of France, about  south of the village of Fleurbaix on the D175 road (rue de Pétillon).

British soldiers of the 19th Infantry Brigade made the earliest burials at the site in October 1914 during the First Battle of Ypres. By the end of the war, the cemetery contained 123 graves. This number nearly tripled after a postwar consolidation of war burial sites, when Le Trou Aid Post was expanded by the architect Sir Herbert Baker.

Described as one of Baker's most sentimental works, the rural site is surrounded by a narrow moat and sheltered by a grove of weeping willows. Visitors approach over a footbridge and enter through a delicate cottage-style gateway.

The cemetery contains more than 350 graves, and over two hundred are unidentified. The dead represent the battlefields of Ypres, Le Maisnil (October 1914), Aubers Ridge (May 1915), Loos (September–October 1915), and Fromelles (July 1916).

See also
Rue-du-Bois Military Cemetery
V.C. Corner Australian Cemetery and Memorial
Fromelles (Pheasant Wood) Military Cemetery

References

External links
 
 

British military memorials and cemeteries
Australian military cemeteries
World War I cemeteries in France
Cemeteries in Pas-de-Calais
Commonwealth War Graves Commission cemeteries in France
Herbert Baker buildings and structures